Synaphe morbidalis is a species of moth of the family Pyralidae described by Achille Guenée in 1849. It is found on Sardinia.

References

Moths described in 1849
Pyralini
Moths of Asia
Moths of Europe